Ming or Song is a category of typefaces used to display Chinese characters, which are used in the Chinese, Japanese and Korean languages. They are currently the most common style of type in print for Chinese and Japanese.

Name 
The names Song (or Sung) and Ming correspond to the Song Dynasty when a distinctive printed style of regular script was developed, and the Ming Dynasty during which that style developed into the Ming typeface style. In Mainland China, the most common name is Song (the Mainland Chinese standardized Ming typeface in Microsoft Windows being named SimSun). In Hong Kong, Taiwan, Japan and Korea, Ming is prevalent. In Hong Kong and Taiwan, “Song typeface” has been used but “Ming typeface” has increased currency since the advent of desktop publishing. Some type foundries  use "Song" to refer to this style of typeface that follows a standard such as the Standard Form of National Characters, and “Ming” to refer to typefaces that resemble forms found in the Kangxi dictionary.

 Chinese: ; Jyutping: Sung3tai2/Ming4tai2
 Japanese: ; rōmaji: Minchōtai
 Korean:
 Hangul: ; Hanja: ; Revised Romanization: Myeongjoche 
 Hangul: ; Hanja: ; Revised Romanization: Batangche

Characteristics 
Characteristics of Ming typefaces include the following:
 The basic structure of regular script
 Thick vertical strokes contrasted with thin horizontal strokes
 Triangles at the end of single horizontal strokes, called  (literally "fish scales") in Japanese, comparable to serifs. These are a print analog of the slight dot caused by pausing one's brush, the "pause technique", used to reinforce the beginning or ending of a stroke, which is characteristic of regular script.
 Overall geometrical regularity

Possessing variable line weight and characteristic decorations at the end of lines similar to serifs, this type style is comparable to Western serif typefaces, as opposed to East Asian gothic typefaces which are comparable to Western sans-serif.

Variations 
Often there are different ways to write the same Chinese character; these are collectively referred to as variant Chinese characters. Some of the differences are caused by character simplification, while others are purely orthographic differences such as stroke styling. The styling of the strokes used in old Ming typefaces came from the style used in the Kangxi Dictionary. 

In mainland China, the modern standardized character forms are specified in the List of Commonly Used Characters in Modern Chinese. Some characters in the list differ from the Kangxi forms solely because they are Simplified while others differ because they use a different variant or orthography.

In Taiwan, the Standard Form of National Characters specifies the modern standardized forms. Unlike the mainland standard, the Taiwan standard uses mostly preexisting character forms but reference back to the style of regular script and reform Ming typefaces based on regular script style extensively, which had attracted criticism from many peoples.

After the postwar kanji reforms in Japan, most of the Kangxi style characters were called  (old style), while the reformed characters were called , causing newer dictionaries to either incorporate both styles or omit the Kangxi styles. In Korea, most typefaces use the Kangxi forms.

There are differences between print and script forms of many Chinese characters, just as there are differences between copperplate and most people's handwriting. Some of these differences are persistent and specific to a style, but others may be no more significant than variations between individual typefaces. None of these variations usually hinder reading.

History

China
The printing industry from the Tang Dynasty reached an apex in the Song Dynasty, during which there were three major areas of production:
Zhejiang, where publications imitated the regular script of Ouyang Xun
Sichuan, where publications imitated the regular script of Yan Zhenqing
Fujian, where publications imitated the regular script of Liu Gongquan

When Song lost control of northern China to the Jin (金) dynasty, its capital was moved to Lin'an (modern Hangzhou), where there was a revival of printing, especially literature from Tang left in what was conquered by the Jin Dynasty. Many publishers were established in Lin'an, including Chén zhái shūjí pù established by Chen Qi, from which publications used a distinct style of regular script with orderly, straight strokes. Modern typefaces of this style are classified as imitation Song typefaces. In the Ming Dynasty, the straightening of strokes in a reprint of a publication from Lin'an started a shift to what became the basis of the Ming style.

Japan 

 are the most commonly used style in print in Japan. There are several variations in use, such as the textbook style and the newspaper style.

The creator of modern Japanese movable-type printing, Motoki Shōzō (or Motogi), modeled his sets of type after those prevailing in China, having learned an electrolytic method of type manufacturing from the American William Gamble in 1869. Motoki then created, based on Gamble's frequency studies of characters in the Chinese Bible, a full set of type with added Japanese characters; in addition to Chinese and Latin characters, Japanese text uses the syllabaries hiragana and katakana.

Korea 
In Korean, a similar category of typefaces for the Korean alphabet hangul was called myeongjo (the Korean reading for the same Chinese characters "") until recently, influenced by the Japanese term. A Ministry of Culture-sponsored standardization of typography terms in 1993 replaced myeongjo with batang (""), the Korean word for “foundation” or “ground” (as opposed to “figure”), and is the current term for the typeface.

Ming typefaces in computing 

Technically, only Chinese characters can be printed in a Ming typeface. However, most modern typefaces (that is, digital typefaces) often also include kana glyphs in a matching style, usually in a precise style resembling handwriting with a brush. Modern Ming typefaces also incorporate Roman type glyphs for Latin characters, letterlike symbols, and numbers. In its modern role comparable to that of western serif typefaces, both kana and Latin characters are usually part of a complete typeface.

Ming typefaces are used officially by the government of China, Japan and Korea.

See also 
 East Asian gothic typeface
 Chinese calligraphy

References

Further reading 
 www.kinkido.net – some information on Chinese typefaces, including Ming typefaces.

External links 
 Nihongo resources: Japanese typefaces
 sci.lang.japan FAQ list of Japanese writing styles
 [chinese mac] Fontstypefaces included with Mac OS and Windows 
 differences between some Ming typefaces

Chinese-language computing
Chinese type styles